Badhra is a tehsil, sub-division and assembly constituency in the Charkhi Dadri district of the Indian state of Haryana. , the tehsil had 22,407 households with a total population of 118,084 of which 62,791 were male and 55,293 female.

Representation

, Badhra is represented by Naina Singh Chautala of Jannayak Janata Party (JJP).

Education
Govt. College For Women, Badhra

See also
Badhra (Haryana Assembly constituency)
Badhra sub-district

References

Cities and towns in Charkhi Dadri district